Yuri I Vladimirovich, commonly known as Yuri Dolgorukiy or the Long Arm (meaning "Far-Reaching", c. 109915 May 1157) was a Rurikid prince. Noted for successfully curbing the privileges of the landowning boyar class in Rostov-Suzdal and his ambitious building programme, Yuri transformed this principality into the independent power that would evolve into early modern Muscovy.

Yuri spent much of his life in internecine strife with the other Rurikid princes for suzerainty over the Kievan Rus, which had been held by his father (Vladimir Monomakh) and his elder brother before him. Although he twice managed to hold Kiev (in September 1149 - April 1151, again in March 1155 - May 1157) and rule as Grand Prince of all Rus', his autocratic rule and perceived foreigner status made him unpopular with the powerful Kievan boyars, leading to his presumed poisoning and the expulsion of his son (later Andrei Bogoliubsky of Vladimir-Suzdal) in 1157. His rule marked the effective end of the Rus' as a unified entity until the Mongol invasions, with powerful provincial territories like Vladimir-Suzdal and Galicia-Volhynia now competing for the throne of Kiev.

Problems in identifying birthdate and mother
According to Vasily Tatishchev, Yuri was born in 1090 which would make him a son of Vladimir Monomakh's first wife Gytha of Wessex, a daughter of Harold Godwinson.

The problem exists with Gytha's date of death. The scholars think it was either 1098 or 1107.

According to the "Testament of Vladimir Monomakh" Yuri's mother died on May 7, 1107. If Gytha died on March 07, 1098 then Yuri Vladimirovich could have been a son of his father's second wife Yefimia.

Some chronicles report that Yuri's elder brother, Viacheslav, said to him: "I am much older than you; I was already bearded when you were born." Since Viacheslav was born in 1083, this supposedly pushes Yuri's birth to c. 1099/1100. However, the Primary Chronicle records the first marriage of Yuri - on 12 January 1108. It means that Yuri was born before c. 1099/1100 (as he couldn't have been 6–9 years old at the time of marriage).

Tatishchev also records that Yuri's son Andrei Bogolyubskiy was born around 1111. It is doubtful that Yuri was at that time younger than 16 or 17.

The question of Yuri's birthday remains open, though taking into account all the above-mentioned information Yuri's birth date can be approximated to  the end of 1080s - first half of 1090s. But then it means that Gytha was indeed his mother.

Activities in Rostov and Suzdal
In 1108 Vladimir Monomakh sent his young son Yuri to govern in his name the vast Vladimir-Suzdal principality in the north-east of Kievan Rus'. In 1121 Yuri quarreled with the boyars of Rostov and moved the capital of his lands from that city to Suzdal. As the area was sparsely populated, Yuri founded many fortresses there. He established the towns of Ksniatin (in 1134), Pereslavl-Zalesski and Yuriev-Polski (in 1152), and Dmitrov (in 1154). The establishment of Tver, Kostroma, and Vologda is also popularly assigned to Yuri.

In 1147 Yuri Dolgorukiy had a meeting with Sviatoslav Olgovich (then prince of Belgorod Kievsky) in a place called Moscow. In 1156 Yuri fortified Moscow with wooden walls and a moat. Although the settlement probably existed later or earlier, Dolgorukiy is often called "the Founder of Moscow".

Struggle for Kiev
For all the interest he took in fortifying his Northern lands, Yuri still coveted the throne of Kiev. It is his active participation in the Southern affairs that earned him the epithet of Dolgorukiy, "the far-reaching". His elder brother Mstislav of Kiev died in 1132, and "the Rus lands fell apart", as one chronicle put it. Yuri instantaneously declared war on the princes of Chernigov, the reigning Grand Prince and his brother Yaropolk II of Kiev, enthroned his son in Novgorod, and captured his father's hereditary principality at Pereyaslav of the South. The Novgorodians, however, betrayed him, and Yuri avenged by seizing their key eastern fortress, Torzhok.

In 1147, Dolgorukiy resumed his struggle for Kiev and in 1149 he captured it, but in 1151 he was driven from the capital of Rus by his nephew Iziaslav. In 1155, Yuri regained Kiev once again. After presumably being poisoned at the feast of a Kievan nobleman, Yuri unexpectedly died in 1157 which sparked anti-Suzdalian uprising in Kiev. Yuri Dolgoruki was interred at the Saviour Church in Berestovo, Kiev, but his tomb is empty.

Marriages and children

The Primary Chronicle records the first marriage of Yuri on 12 January 1108. His first wife was a daughter of Aepa Ocenevich, Khan of the Cumans. Her paternal grandfather was Osen. Her people belonged to the Cumans, a confederation of pastoralists and warriors of Turkic origin.

His second wife Helena survived him and moved to Constantinople. Her paternity is not known for certain but Nikolay Karamzin was the first to theorise that Helena was returning to her native city. She has since been theorised to be a member of the Komnenos dynasty which ruled the Byzantine Empire throughout the life of Yuri.

Several websites have speculated that his wife was a daughter of Isaac Komnenos. The identification would make her a granddaughter of Alexios I Komnenos and Irene Doukaina. There are no documents to back up this connection.

Yuri had at least fifteen children. The identities of the mothers are not known for certain
 The following are considered elder children and usually attributed to the first wife.
 Rostislav, Prince of Pereyaslavl (d. 6 April 1151).
 Ivan, Prince of Kursk (d. 24 February 1147).
 Olga (d. 1189). Married Yaroslav Osmomysl.
 Andrei I Bogolyubsky (c. 1111 – 28 June 1174).
 Maria. Married Oleg Sviatoslavich, Prince of Novhorod-Siverskyi.
 Sviatoslav (d. 11 January 1174).
 Yaroslav (d. 12 April 1166).
 Gleb of Kiev (d. 1171).
 Boris, Prince of Belgorod and Turov (d. 12 May 1159).
 Mstislav, Prince of Novgorod (d. 1166).
 Vasilko, Prince of Suzdal (deposed in 1161).
 The following are considered youngest and typically attributed to the second wife
 Mikhail of Vladimir (d. 20 June 1176).
 Vsevolod the Big Nest (1154 – 12 April 1212).
 Davyd, Prince of Murom, Married Euphrosyne of Murom, Peasant from the Village of Laskovo, Ryazan Governorate  (d. 25 June 1228)
 Yaropolk.

Memorials

Muscovites have cherished Yuri's memory as the legendary founder of their city. His patron saint, Saint George appears on the coat of arms of Moscow slaying a dragon. In 1954, a monument to him designed by sculptor Sergei Orlov was erected on Moscow's Tverskaya Street, the city's principal avenue, in front of the Moscow municipality.

Dolgoruki's image was stamped on the Medal "In Commemoration of the 800th Anniversary of Moscow", introduced in 1947.

There are monuments of Yuri Dolgorukiy in Dmitrov and Kostroma.

The nuclear submarine Yuri Dolgoruki is named after him.

References

Further reading
 Bibliography of the history of the Early Slavs and Rus'
 Bibliography of Russian history (1223–1613)
 List of Slavic studies journals

External links
 Genealogical connections

Monomakhovichi family
Grand Princes of Kiev
Russian city founders
History of Moscow
1099 births
1157 deaths

Year of birth uncertain
Eastern Orthodox monarchs
12th-century rulers in Europe
Burials at the Church of the Saviour at Berestove